Lâdik or Inanjids (Modern Turkish: İnançoğulları Beyliği ) was an Anatolian beylik with its capital in Denizli. It was one of the frontier principalities established by Oghuz Turkish clans after the decline of Seljuk Sultanate of Rûm. Its name derives from that of Laodicea on the Lycus.

The current Turkish province of Denizli was named the sanjak (sub-province) of Lâdik till the early years of the Republic of Turkey.

Its rulers are listed below:

See also
 List of Sunni Muslim dynasties

References

Anatolian beyliks
History of Denizli
States and territories established in 1262
History of Denizli Province